Jurmin also known as Hiurmine of Blythburgh, was an Anglo-Saxon prince who was the son and heir of Anna of East Anglia, a 7th-century king of East Anglia, a kingdom which today includes the English counties of Norfolk and Suffolk. As such, he was the brother of saints Seaxburh of Ely, Æthelthryth, and Æthelburh of Faremoutiers.

Jumin and his father were killed in 654 at the Battle of Bulcamp, fighting against the Mercians. His body was originally buried at nearby Blythburgh Priory but later moved to Bury St Edmunds. 

Jurmin was venerated as a saint: his feast day is 24 February.

References

Sources

External links
 

7th-century English people
East Anglian saints
East Anglians
Burials at Blythburgh Priory